Popiela is a Polish surname. Notable people with the surname include:

 Dariusz Popiela (born 1985), Polish canoeist
 Jarosław Popiela (born 1974), Polish footballer
 Krystian Popiela (1998–2018), Polish footballer

See also
 

Polish-language surnames